Chugiak High School is a public high school located in Chugiak, Anchorage, Alaska, and a part of the Anchorage School District. Chugiak's mascot is the Mustang and the school colors are blue, black, and white. In 2005, Chugiak's student population was split as half their students went to the new Eagle River High School.  As of 2020, it has a student enrollment of 905 and 47 teachers.

Demographics
The student body at Chugiak is fairly homogeneous. Ethnic/racial composition for school year 2015-16:

Academics
Chugiak offers several Advanced Placement courses, including:
 AP English Language and Composition
 AP English Literature and Composition
 AP Comparative Government and Politics
 AP United States Government and Politics
 AP United States History
 AP World History
 AP Calculus AB and BC
 AP Statistics
 AP Biology
 AP Physics 1 and 2
 AP Spanish Language and Culture
 AP German Language and Culture

The school has an 86.98% graduation rate, higher than the district average of 69.40%. Chugiak has continually scored higher than the district average in terms of reading, writing, and mathematics proficiency on the High School Graduation Qualifying Exam (HSGQE).  In the 2008–2009 school year, 10th graders at Chugiak showed 97.99% proficiency on the HSGQE Reading Test, 90.46% proficiency on the HSGQE Writing Test, and 90.73% proficiency on the HSGQE Mathematics Test (as compared to respective district averages of 91.54%, 80.15%, and 82.44%).

Athletics

Football
In September 2007, Chugiak's football team was ranked #1 in its division in the state.  In the 2009 season, the Chugiak football team took second place for large schools in Alaska.  The softball team took second place at the state competition that year as well.

Soccer
Under coach Ed Blahous, the boys' varsity team took numerous state titles beginning in 1983.

Notable alumni
 Sam Hoger - appeared on the first season of The Ultimate Fighter, retired professional MMA fighter
 Randy Phillips (1969) - member of the Alaska House of Representatives and the Alaska Senate from Eagle River 1977-2003
 Bill Stoltze (1979) - member of the Alaska House of Representatives from Chugiak since 2003
 Brian Swanson (1994) - player with the Alaska Aces;  previously played with NHL teams the Edmonton Oilers and the Atlanta Thrashers
 Christian Allen (1994) - video game designer
 Scott Parker (ca. 1996) - former NHL player with the Colorado Avalanche and the San Jose Sharks
 Pam Dreyer (1999) - Bronze medalist in 2006 Winter Olympics, Women's Hockey Goalie
 Sara King (2001) - science fiction writer
 Kelsey Griffin (2005) - player with the Connecticut Sun of the WNBA
 Britney Young (2006) - Actress on the Netflix series GLOW (TV series)
 Alev Kelter (2009) - Rugby player for the US National team

References

External links
 Chugiak High School website

Anchorage School District
High schools in Anchorage, Alaska
Public high schools in Alaska